The 1970 New Zealand Open, also known by its sponsored name Benson and Hedges Open, was a combined men's and women's tennis tournament played on outdoor grass courts in Auckland, New Zealand from 26 January until 1 February 1970. Roger Taylor and Ann Jones won the singles titles.

Finals

Men's singles
 Roger Taylor defeated  Tom Okker 6–4, 6–4, 6–1

Women's singles
 Ann Jones defeated  Kerry Melville 0–6, 6–4, 6–1

Men's doubles
 Dick Crealy /  Ray Ruffels defeated  John Alexander /  Phil Dent 6–4, 3–6, 6–3, 8–6

Women's doubles
 Margaret Court /  Ann Jones defeated  Karen Krantzcke /  Kerry Melville 6–0, 6–4

References

External links
 ATP tournament profile

1970 in New Zealand tennis
1970
1970 Grand Prix (tennis)
January 1970 sports events in New Zealand
February 1970 sports events in New Zealand